Cyperus kappleri is a species of sedge that is native to northern parts of South America.

See also 
 List of Cyperus species

References 

kappleri
Plants described in 1854
Flora of Bolivia
Flora of Colombia
Flora of Guyana
Flora of Suriname
Flora of Venezuela
Taxa named by Ernst Gottlieb von Steudel